This is a list of notable members of Psi Upsilon:

Government and Public Service

Presidents
 Chester A. Arthur (President of the United States)
 William Howard Taft (President of the United States)

Prime Ministers
 Paul Martin (Prime Minister of Canada)

Vice Presidents
 Nelson Rockefeller (Vice President of the United States)

Cabinet Members
 Amos T. Akerman (United States Attorney General)
 William Cohen (United States Secretary of Defense)
 Porter Goss (Director of the Central Intelligence Agency)
 W. Averell Harriman (Under-Secretary of State, Secretary of Commerce, Governor of New York)
 William Moulton Ingraham (United States Assistant Secretary of War, Mayor of Portland, Maine)
 John Kerry (United States Secretary of State, United States Senator from Massachusetts, 2004 Democratic Nominee for President of the United States)
 Robert Lansing (United States Secretary of State)
 George B. Loring (United States Secretary of Agriculture)
 Archibald MacLeish (U.S. Poet Laureate, Three-time Pulitzer Prize recipient, Under-Secretary of State, Lawyer)
 Franklin MacVeagh (United States Secretary of the Treasury)
 John Negroponte (United States Deputy Secretary of State, Director of National Intelligence, United States Ambassador to the United Nations)
 William Cary Sanger (United States Assistant Secretary of War)
 Frederick W. Seward (United States Assistant Secretary of State)
 Henry L. Stimson (United States Secretary of State)
 William H. Webster (Chair of the Homeland Security Advisory Council)
 Hugh R. Wilson (United States Assistant Secretary of State, United States Ambassador to Germany)

Governors
 Charles B. Andrews (Governor of Connecticut)
 Simeon Eben Baldwin (Governor of Connecticut)
 Charles H. Bell (Governor of New Hampshire, United States Senator from New Hampshire) 
 Daniel Henry Chamberlain (Governor of South Carolina)
 Walter F. Frear (Territorial Governor of Hawaii)
 Francis Burton Harrison (Governor-General of the Philippines, member of the U.S. House of Representatives from New York)
 George Edwin King (Premier of New Brunswick, Puisne Justice of the Supreme Court of Canada)
 Pendleton Murrah (Governor of Texas)
 Benjamin Odell (Governor of New York)
 Benjamin F. Prescott (Governor of New Hampshire)
 Henry B. Quinby (Governor of New Hampshire)
 Alexander H. Rice (Governor of Massachusetts, member of the U.S. House of Representatives from Massachusetts, Mayor of Boston)
 Henry Roberts (Governor of Connecticut)

Senators
 Samuel G. Arnold (United States Senator from Rhode Island)
 John Christopher Burch (Secretary of the United States Senate)
 LeBaron Bradford Colt (United States Senator from Rhode Island)
 Chauncey Depew (United States Senator from New York)
 Orris S. Ferry (United States Senator from Connecticut)
 William P. Frye (United States Senator from Maine)
 Joseph Roswell Hawley (United States Senator from Connecticut, Governor of Connecticut)
 Anthony Higgins (United States Senator from Delaware)
 Alfred B. Kittredge (United States Senator from South Dakota)
 Henry F. Lippitt (United States Senator from Rhode Island)
 Francis G. Newlands (United States Senator from Nevada)
 James W. Patterson (United States Senator from New Hampshire)
 John Sewell Sanborn (Senator for Wellington, Quebec)
 John Coit Spooner (United States Senator from Wisconsin)
 Robert A. Taft (United States Senator from Ohio)
 George P. Wetmore (United States Senator from Rhode Island, Governor of Rhode Island)

Members of the United States House of Representatives
 William S. Barry (United States Representative from Mississippi)
 Curtis Coe Bean (United States Representative from Arizona)
 Benjamin T. Eames (United States Representative from Rhode Island)
 Constantine C. Esty (United States Representative from Massachusetts)
 Walbridge A. Field (United States Representative from Massachusetts)
 Tom Kean Jr. (United States Representative from New Jersey and former State Senator)
William Henry Fitzhugh Lee (United States Representative from Virginia)
 Theodore Lyman III (United States Representative from Massachusetts)
 Jonas H. McGowan (United States Representative from Indiana)
 Edward Tylor Miller (United States Representative from Maryland)
 John U. Pettit (United States Representative from Indiana)
 William Walter Phelps (United States Representative from New Jersey)
 James Pike (United States Representative from New Hampshire)
 Clarkson Nott Potter (United States Representative from New York)
 William W. Rice (United States Representative from Massachusetts)
 William Erigena Robinson (United States Representative from New York)
 Julius Hawley Seelye (United States Representative from Massachusetts, President of Amherst College)
 Eli Thayer (United States Representative from Massachusetts)
 James Wakefield (United States Representative from Minnesota, Lieutenant Governor of Minnesota)

Judges and Justices
 Elmer B. Adams (United States circuit judge of the United States Court of Appeals for the Eighth Circuit)
 Isaac Atwater (Justice of the Minnesota Supreme Court)
 Darius Baker (Justice of the Rhode Island Supreme Court)
 Wilbur F. Booth (Senior Judge of the United States Court of Appeals for the Eighth Circuit)
 Horace R. Buck (Justice of the Montana Supreme Court)
 Lewis Whitehouse Clark (Chief Justice of the New Hampshire Supreme Court, Attorney General of New Hampshire)
 Isaac Clinton Collins (Judge of the Ohio Courts of Common Pleas)
 Norman Staunton Dike (New York Supreme Court Judge)
 Lucilius A. Emery (Chief Justice of the Maine Supreme Judicial Court, Maine Attorney General)
 Samuel Dorr Faulkner (County judge and surrogate of Livingston County, New York)
 Francis Miles Finch (Judge of the New York Court of Appeals)
 John Clinton Gray (Judge of the New York Court of Appeals)
 Howard Clark Hollister (United States district judge of the United States District Court for the Southern District of Ohio)
 Rensselaer Nelson (Judge of the United States District Court for the District of Minnesota)
 Benjamin K. Phelps (New York County District Attorney)
 Joseph Lewis Stackpole (Member of the Board of General Appraisers)
 John Paul Stevens (Supreme Court justice)
 William Kneeland Townsend (Judge of the United States Court of Appeals for the Second Circuit)
 Leonard Eugene Wales (United States district judge of the United States District Court for the District of Delaware) 
 Andrew P. Wiswell (Justice of the Maine Supreme Judicial Court)
 Daniel Thew Wright Sr. (Member of the Ohio Supreme Court Commission)

State and local office holders
 Beau Biden (Attorney General of Delaware)
 Charles Greene Came (Member of the Maine House of Representatives)
 John Morton Eshleman (Lieutenant Governor of California)
 Oran Faville (Lieutenant Governor of Iowa)
 Willard Cutting Flagg (Member of the Illinois State Senate)
 Dwight Foster (Massachusetts Attorney General)
 Samuel Abbott Green (Mayor of Boston, Massachusetts)
 Freeman Clark Griswold (Member of the Massachusetts House of Representatives)
 William H. Haile (Lieutenant Governor of Massachusetts, Mayor of Springfield, Massachusetts)
 Charles Hadley Hamilton (City Attorney of Milwaukee)
 Alfred S. Hartwell (Attorney General of Hawaii)
 Charles Phelps (Connecticut Attorney General)
 Edward Griffin Parker (Member of both houses of the Massachusetts Legislature)
 James Hammond Trumbull (Secretary of the State of Connecticut)
 George Washington Woodruff (Attorney General of Pennsylvania, Member of the College Football Hall of Fame)
 Timothy L. Woodruff (Lieutenant Governor of New York)
Dean Conant Worcester (Philippine Secretary of the Interior)

Military
 Nicholas Longworth Anderson (Colonel of the 6th Ohio Infantry Regiment in the American Civil War)
 James Chaplin Beecher (Congregationalist minister and Colonel for the Union Army during the American Civil War)
 Charles C. Dodge (Union brigadier general in the American Civil War)
 Richard Foster (American abolitionist and Union Army officer)
 Charles Henry Howard (Officer in the Union Army during the American Civil War)
 Joseph C. Jackson (Union  brevet brigadier general in the American Civil War)
 Sumner Increase Kimball (General Superintendent of the United States Life-Saving Service)
 Thomas Jefferson Morgan (Commissioner of Indian Affairs, American Brevet Brigadier General during the American Civil War)
 Reuben D. Mussey Jr. (Union Army colonel during the American Civil War)
 Francis Winthrop Palfrey (American historian and Civil War officer)
 Isaac Ferdinand Quinby (Union general during the American Civil War)
 Edward H. Ripley (Union Army officer in the American Civil War)
 George Crockett Strong (Union brigadier general in the American Civil War)
 Wheelock G. Veazey (Commander-in-Chief of the Grand Army of the Republic)
 J. Fred. Waring (Senior officer of the Confederate States Army)
 William Collins Whitney (United States Secretary of the Navy)

Other
 Thomas Rutherford Bacon (Leading Mugwump)
 Herbert Wolcott Bowen (Ambassador of the United States to Venezuela)
 Edward Towle Brooks (Member of the Canadian Parliament for Town of Sherbrooke)
 John Safford Fiske (Consul of the United States at Leith, Scotland)
 Burton Harrison (Private secretary to Confederate States of America president Jefferson Davis)
 Robert Treat Paine (Philanthropist)
 Eugene Schuyler (American scholar, writer, explorer and diplomat)

Law
 Francis N. Bangs (Founder of Davis Polk)
 James William Beekman Jr. (American lawyer, President of the Saint Nicholas Society of the City of New York)
 William Allen Butler (President of the American Bar Association)
 Frederic René Coudert Sr. (American lawyer with Coudert Brothers)
 Maunsell Bradhurst Field (American lawyer, diplomat, judge, and author)
 Roger Sherman Baldwin Foster (American Lawyer)
 Lewis Cass Ledyard (President of the New York City Bar Association)
 John Godfrey Saxe II (President of the New York State Bar Association)
 William Andrew Sutherland (Lawyer)
 Thomas Thacher (American lawyer)
 Henry Waters Taft (Name Partner at Cadwalader, Wickersham & Taft)
 Albion W. Tourgée (Lead Attorney in Plessy v. Ferguson, founder of Bennett College)
 Robert William Wright (American lawyer, politician, newspaper editor, and author)

Theology
 Maltbie Davenport Babcock (American clergyman, author of This is My Father's World)
 Herman Norton Barnum (Christian missionary stationed in Kharpert)
 Benjamin Brewster (Episcopal Bishop of the Maine and Missionary Bishop of Western Colorado)
 Thomas Frederick Davies (Bishop of the Bishop of Michigan in the Episcopal Church)
 Andrew Flinn Dickson (American minister and author)
 Henry Martyn Dexter (American Congregational clergyman and author)
 Angus Dun (Bishop of the Episcopal Diocese of Washington)
 George Zabriskie Gray (Clergyman, educator and theologian of the Episcopal Church in the United States)
 Henry Hamilton Hadley  (American theologian)
 Charles Richmond Henderson (American Baptist minister and sociologist)
 George Hendric Houghton (American Protestant Episcopal clergyman)
 Henry Harris Jessup (American Presbyterian missionary)
 Edwin Stevens Lines (Bishop of the Episcopal Diocese of Newark, New Jersey)
 Abram Newkirk Littlejohn (Bishop of the Episcopal Diocese of Long Island)
 Willard Francis Mallalieu (American bishop of the Methodist Episcopal Church)
 Jacob Merrill Manning (Congregational clergyman)
 Theodore T. Munger (American Congregational clergyman, theologian and writer)
 Isaac Lea Nicholson (Bishop of the Episcopal Diocese of Milwaukee)
 William Woodruff Niles (Bishop of the Episcopal Diocese of New Hampshire)
 Sidney Catlin Partridge (Bishop of Kyoto and Bishop of the Episcopal Diocese of West Missouri)
 William Stevens Perry (Bishop of the Episcopal Diocese of Iowa)
 Thomas Scott Preston (Roman Catholic Vicar-General of New York)
 B. T. Roberts (American Methodist bishop)
 Henry Martyn Scudder (Missionary)
 Walter Ashbel Sellew (Bishop of the Free Methodist Church)
 George Franklin Seymour (Bishop of the Episcopal Diocese of Springfield)
 John Franklin Spalding (Bishop of Colorado)
 Augustus Hopkins Strong (Baptist minister and theologian)
 Henry Winter Syle (First deaf person to be ordained a priest in the Episcopal Church in the United States)
 James H. Van Buren (Bishop of the Episcopal Diocese of Puerto Rico)
 George Roe Van De Water (Episcopal priest)
 Erastus Wentworth (Methodist Episcopal minister, missionary to Foochow, China)

Business and Technology
 Robert Orville Anderson (Founder of the Atlantic Richfield Company)
 William H. T. Bush (Businessman, member of the Bush Family)
 John Cleghorn (Chairman of the Royal Bank of Canada)
 Peter Coors (Founder and CEO of Coors Brewing Company, owner of Colorado Rockies)
 Tony Fadell (Inventor of the iPod, co-inventor of the iPhone)
 William Clay Ford Sr. (VP of Ford Motor Company, owner of Detroit Lions)
 Charles William Harkness (Director at Standard Oil)
 Stephen Mandel (Founder of Lone Pine Capital)
 John Jay Phelps (Railroad Baron)
 Alexander Henry Stevens (American banker)
 John Textor (Executive Chairman of fuboTV; Owner of Premier League Crystal Palace Football Club)
 Dennis Tito (American engineer, entrepreneur, and astronaut)
 Henry Van Brunt (American architect and architectural writer)
 Cornelius Vanderbilt III (Member of the Vanderbilt family)
 Levi C. Wade (President of the Mexican Central Railway)
 Thomas J. Watson (Chairman and CEO of IBM)

Athletics
 Dick Barrett (Baseball player)
 Jay Berwanger (First Heisman Trophy Winner)
 Chuck Carney (Football and Basketball player)
 William Herbert Corbin (Football Player)
 Thomas Bayne Denègre (Captain of the Yale Rowing team.
 Jack Depler (Football player and coach)
 Fred Folsom (University of Colorado football coach, namesake of football stadium)
 William P. Graves (Head coach of North Carolina Tar Heels football) 
 Louis K. Hull (Football Player)
 Ed Marinaro (American actor and football player)
 Eugene Lamb Richards (Football Player)
 Sam Schmidt (Former Indy Racing League driver and current NTT IndyCar Series and Indy Lights series team owner)
 Amos Alonzo Stagg (Pioneering college football coach)
 Ray Tompkins (Football Player)
 Henry Twombly (Football Player)
 Alexander Hamilton Wallis (Football Player)
 John Wildhack (Athletic director at Syracuse University)
 Bud Wilkinson (Oklahoma Sooners football coach)

Arts and Media
 Horatio Alger (Author)
 Richard Barthelmess (Actor)
 Michael Bay (Film director known for big-budget action films)
 John Eliot Bowen (Author)
 Hjalmar Hjorth Boyesen (Norwegian-American author and college professor)
 Dan Brown (Author of The Da Vinci Code and other notable works)
 Henry Armitt Brown (American author and orator)
 Harlan Coben (Author of Myron Bolitar series and other notable works)
 Bud Collyer (American radio actor, announcer, and game show host)
 Bradshaw Crandell (American artist and illustrator)
 Reuben T. Durrett (Founder Louisville Free Public Library, Main organizer of The Filson Historical Society)
 Greg Giraldo (Stand-up comedian, television personality, and lawyer)
 J. Cheever Goodwin (American musical theatre librettist, lyricist and producer)
 Gilbert Grosvenor (First full-time editor of National Geographic magazine)
 Joseph Converse Heywood (American poet)
 John Taylor Johnston (President of the Metropolitan Museum of Art)
 Stacy Keach (Actor)
 Frederic Lawrence Knowles (American poet)
 Jason Pinter (Author)
 George P. Putnam (American publisher, writer and explorer, Husband of Amelia Earhart)
 Samuel Porter Putnam (American freethinker, critic and publicist)
 Frank Dempster Sherman (American poet and academic)
 Louis Judson Swinburne (Author)
 Frank Tuttle (Hollywood film director and writer)
 Tommy Vietor (Commentator and podcaster) 
 Charles Rumford Walker (American Historian, Political Scientist, and Novelist)
 Charles Dudley Warner (Co-author of The Gilded Age: A Tale of Today)
 Edwin Percy Whipple (American essayist and critic)
 Herve D. Wilkins (organist and composer)
 Danny Zuker (television writer and producer)

Science
 Erwin Hinckley Barbour (American geologist and paleontologist)
 William G. Binney (Malacologist)
 Hamilton Castner (American industrial chemist)
 Daniel Cady Eaton (American botanist)
 George Bird Grinnell (American anthropologist, historian, naturalist, and writer)
 Henry Williamson Haynes (American archaeologist)
 Henry Guernsey Hubbard (American entomologist and horticulturist)
 Newton Spaulding Manross (American scientist and engineer)
 Othniel Charles Marsh (American professor of Paleontology, President of the National Academy of Sciences)
 Thomas Burr Osborne (Biochemist, Discovered Vitamin A)
 Alpheus Spring Packard (American entomologist and palaeontologist, founder of The American Naturalist) 
 John Addison Porter (American professor of chemistry and physician, Namesake of the John Addison Porter Prize, Founder of the Scroll and Key senior society)
 Maurice Howe Richardson (American surgeon)
 Ogden Rood (American physicist)
 Henry Reed Stiles (American physician)
 Henry Shaler Williams (American geologist)

Academia
 Nathan Abbott (Dean of Stanford Law School)
 Charles Kendall Adams (President of University of Wisconsin–Madison, President of Cornell University)
 Herbert Baxter Adams (Professor at Johns Hopkins University)
 Charles Augustus Aiken (President of Union College, Professor at Princeton University)
 James Burrill Angell (President of the University of Michigan)
 Nicholas Murray Butler (President of Columbia University)
 Clarence G. Child (Dean of the University of Pennsylvania graduate school)
 William S. Clark (President of University of Massachusetts Amherst)
 Rufus Cowles Crampton (President of Illinois College, Founder of Brown's Business College)
 Amos Noyes Currier (President of the University of Iowa)
 David Stuart Dodge (Professor at the Syrian Protestant College, Beirut)
 Hollis B. Frissell (President of Hampton University)
William Watson Goodwin (Eliot professor of Greek at Harvard University)
 Daniel B. Hagar (Principal of the Canajoharie Academy, Norwich Academy, and Salem Normal School)
 Benjamin Francis Hayes (Professor at Bates College)
 Charles Rockwell Lanman (American scholar of the Sanskrit language)
 George W. Kirchwey (Dean of Columbia Law School)
 Ralza M. Manly (Founder of the Richmond Colored Normal School)
 Edward Duffield Neill (President of Macalester College)
 William Alfred Packard (American classical scholar)
 Charles Payne (President of Ohio Wesleyan University)
 James Mills Peirce (Professor at Harvard University)
 Albert Perkins (Principal of Phillips Exeter Academy)
 Rob Reich (American political scientist)
 William James Rolfe (American educator and Shakespearean scholar)
 James Grafton Rogers (Dean of the University of Colorado Law School, Assistant Secretary of State)
 Richard S. Rust (Founder of the Freedmen's Aid Society)
 John Theodore Saxe (professor at the Albany Academy)
 David Paige Smith (Professor at Yale Medical School)
 Goldwin Smith (Professor at Cornell University
 William Graham Sumner (Professor at Yale University)
 Horace Dutton Taft (Founder of the Taft School)
 James Kingsley Thacher (American professor of medicine)
 Sherman Day Thacher (Founder and first headmaster of The Thacher School)
 William Seymour Tyler (Professor at Amherst College, original trustee of Smith College)
 James Lyman Whitney (co-founding organizer of the American Library Association)
 John Henry Wright (Dean of the Harvard Graduate School of Arts and Sciences)

References

Psi Upsilon
Lists of members of United States student societies